Tea is a beverage made from steeping the processed leaves, buds, or twigs of the tea bush in water.

Tea or TEA may also refer to:

Beverage and food
 Tea (meal), any of several meals, involving different times and food
 Herbal tea, or tisane, a catch-all term for any non-caffeinated beverage made from the infusion or decoction of herbs, spices, or other plant material
 Traditional English Ale, the flagship ale produced by Hogs Back Brewery in England

People
 Tea (given name), a feminine given name
 Tea, a Cambodian surname
 Tea Banh (born 1945), Cambodian politician
 Thierry Tea, French-Cambodian businessman
 Téa, a feminine given name
 Tea, the legendary wife of Érimón and mother of Íriel Fáid
 Tea Tephi, legendary daughter of Zedekiah which is proposed to be the same as the Tea (wife of Érimón) above

Science and technology

Chemistry
 Tetraethylammonium, a potassium channel blocker used in neurophysiology
 Triethanolamine, an organic chemical used in cosmetics and to bind aluminium ions
 Triethylaluminium, a volatile organic chemical used in jet engines and as co-catalyst in olefin polymerization
 Triethylamine, a colorless, "fishy"-smelling organic chemical used in chemical synthesis
 5-epiaristolochene synthase, an enzyme
 Thermal Energy Analyzer, an analytical detector for tobacco-specific nitrosamines

Medicine
 Test of Essential Academic Skills, a standardized test for nursing school admission
 Transient epileptic amnesia, a temporal lobe epilepsy

Other
 Tea (programming language), a high level scripting language for the Java environment combining features from Scheme, Tcl and Java
 TEA laser, (Transversely Excited Atmospheric)
 Tiny Encryption Algorithm, a block cipher notable for its simplicity of description and implementation
 TETRA Encryption Algorithm, an encryption algorithm used in Terrestrial Trunked Radio
 Tea (genus), a genus of spider hunting wasps
 TEA (text editor) (Text Editor of the Atomic Era)
 453 Tea, an asteroid

Places
 Tea, South Dakota, a suburb of Sioux Falls in the US
 Tea River, a river in Brazil

Arts and entertainment
 Tea, a 2000 novel by Stacey D'Erasmo
 Tea: A Mirror of Soul, a 2002 opera by composer Tan Dun
 "Tea", another name for the Chinese Dance in The Nutcracker
 TEA (band), a Swiss progressive heavy rock band

Organizations and companies
 Tamil Eelam Army, a defunct Tamil separatist group in Sri Lanka
 Texas Economics Association, a student organization at the University of Texas at Austin
 Texas Education Agency, a branch of the government of the US state of Texas which oversees public primary and secondary education
 Themed Entertainment Association, a group representing people involved in theme parks and similar attractions
 Thorium Energy Alliance
 Tirupur Exporters' Association, an association of cotton knitwear exporters from Tirupur, India
 Trans European Airways, Belgium-based airline, now defunct
 Trenes Especiales Argentinos (Spanish: "Special Argentine Trains"), a private railway company in Argentina
 Trustees Executors and Agency Company, collapsed Australian trustee company (1879–1983)
 Tenerife Espacio de las Artes, cultural space and building in Tenerife, Canary Islands

Other uses
 Targeted Employment Area, a designation investment region of the United States
 Test of English for Aviation, a language proficiency test
 Transgender Erotica Awards, movie awards for transgender pornography
 Transportation Equity Act for the 21st Century, a US federal planning law 1998–2003
 Tea (cannabis), a slang term for marijuana made popular in the 1950s by Jack Kerouac in novels such as On the Road
 Tea (gossip), a slang term for gossip

See also
 Tee, an item of sports equipment
 T, the letter of the alphabet
 T (disambiguation)